Winter Duathlon is a take off Winter triathlon with Run - XC Ski - Run legs. In 2007 various people including Channel Multisport were trying to grow the sport and encourage more people to participate in the hope that Winter Triathlon will be included in the 2010 Winter Olympics.

Another use of the duathlon is in cross-country skiing where skiers have a mass start using the classical technique and ski a specific distance (men - 15 km, women - 7.5 km), then change their skis, poles, and boots in a pit stop manner similar to a triathlon, then ski at the same specific distance (men - 15 km, women - 7.5 km) in the freestyle (skating) technique. The winner of the event is the competitor who crosses the finish line first. It was first introduced at the FIS Nordic World Ski Championships 2003 in Val di Fiemme as a 10 km + 10 km event for men, 5 km + 5 km event for women. The distances for the double pursuit were lengthened to their current length at the following world championships in Oberstdorf. This is referred to as a double pursuit.

Duathlon
Duathlon
Endurance games
Individual sports
Cross-country skiing